Mariola Katarzyna Zenik (née Barbachowska; born 3 July 1982) is a retired Polish volleyball player, a member of the Poland women's national volleyball team, a participant in the Olympic Games Beijing 2008, European Champion 2005, a bronze medalist of the European Championship 2009, and five-time Polish Champion (2008, 2009, 2011, 2013, 2015).

Career

National team
In 2005 Zenik achieved the title of European Champion. In October 2009 with her teammates she won the bronze medal of European Championship 2009 after winning a match against Germany.

In August 2017 she took a break from her career because she was pregnant.

Sporting achievements

Clubs

CEV Cup
  2006/2007 - with VC Zarechie Odintsovo

National championships
 2001/2002  Polish Championship, with Skra Warszawa
 2003/2004  Polish Championship, with KPSK Stal Mielec
 2005/2006  Polish Championship, with Nafta-Gaz Piła
 2006/2007  Russian Cup, with VC Zarechie Odintsovo
 2007/2008  Polish Championship, with MKS Muszynianka-Fakro Muszyna
 2008/2009  Polish Championship, with MKS Muszynianka-Fakro Muszyna
 2009/2010  Polish SuperCup 2009, with Bank BPS Muszynianka Fakro Muszyna
 2009/2010  Polish Championship, with Bank BPS Muszynianka Fakro Muszyna
 2010/2011  Polish Cup, with Bank BPS Muszynianka Fakro Muszyna
 2010/2011  Polish Championship, with Bank BPS Muszynianka Fakro Muszyna
 2011/2012  Polish SuperCup 2011, with Bank BPS Muszynianka Fakro Muszyna
 2011/2012  Polish Championship, with Bank BPS Muszynianka Fakro Muszyna
 2012/2013  Polish Championship, with PGE Atom Trefl Sopot
 2013/2014  Polish Championship, with PGE Atom Trefl Sopot
 2014/2015  Polish SuperCup 2014, with KPS Chemik Police
 2014/2015  Polish Championship, with KPS Chemik Police

National team
 1999  CEV U18 European Championship
 2000  CEV U20 European Championship
 2005  CEV European Championship
 2009  CEV European Championship

Individually
 1999 CEV U18 European Championship - Most Valuable Player
 2006 Polish Cup - Best Receiver
 2007 Montreux Volley Masters - Best Digger
 2009 Polish Cup - Best Digger
 2010 Polish Cup - Best Digger
 2011 Polish Cup - Best Receiver

State awards
 2005  Gold Cross of Merit

References

External links
 ORLENLiga player profile

1982 births
Living people
People from Węgrów County
Sportspeople from Masovian Voivodeship
Polish women's volleyball players
Recipients of the Gold Cross of Merit (Poland)
Olympic volleyball players of Poland
Volleyball players at the 2008 Summer Olympics